The initials RMV can refer to:

 Rättsmedicinalverket, the Swedish National Board of Forensic Medicine
 Registry of Motor Vehicles in Massachusetts, similar to Department of Motor Vehicles (DMV) in other states of the U.S.
 Rhein-Main-Verkehrsverbund, a German rail transit association
 Rijksmuseum voor Volkenkunde, the National Museum of Ethnology in Leiden, Netherlands
 Royal Mail Vessel, a mail ship prefix